Simplex is an automobile manufacturer that existed briefly, in France, between 1919 and 1921.

The name Simplex was used during the early years of the twentieth century by a number of automobile manufacturers including one each in  the Netherlands and England, and by (at least) two auto-makers in North America.   The French Simplex company was not connected with these.

The car
Simplex took a stand at the Paris Motor Show in October 1919 and exhibited a light “voiturette” style car featuring a single cylinder horizontal motor of 735cc.   The motor was balanced by an imaginatively configured longitudinal counter-weight which was intended to limit engine vibrations.

The wheelbase was a relatively modest .   Front brakes were included.

The car’s “Bull-nose” style radiator is reminiscent of the pre-war  Morris Oxford.

Sources and notes
David Burgess Wise, The Illustrated Encyclopedia of Automobiles, New Burlington Books, 1979, 

Car manufacturers of France
Defunct motor vehicle manufacturers of France
Vehicle manufacturing companies established in 1919
French companies established in 1919
Vehicle manufacturing companies disestablished in 1921
1919 establishments in France
1921 disestablishments in France